Chah Kharg (also Romanized as  Chāh Kharg) is a village in Shamil Rural District, Takht District, Bandar Abbas County, Hormozgan Province, Iran. At the 2006 census, its population was 514, in 109 families.

References 

Populated places in Bandar Abbas County